Cilla is a feminine given name.

Cilla may also refer to:

Associated with British singer Cilla Black
Cilla (album), by Black
Cilla (TV series), a 1968–1976 variety show hosted by Black
Cilla (2014 TV series), 2014 TV drama about Black
Cilla The Musical, 2017 stage adaptation of the TV drama

Other meanings
Cilla (moth), synonym of the moth genus Gabara
Tropical Cyclone Cilla, January 2003
8744 Cilla, a main-belt asteroid
Cilla (city), a town mentioned by Homer in the Iliad

See also
Cila (disambiguation)